Elurivari Palem is a village located in Andhra Pradesh state, India.

Villages in Prakasam district